The New People's Party (NPP) is a conservative political party in Hong Kong. Chaired by Regina Ip, it is currently the fourth largest party in the Legislative Council.

Established by former senior government official Regina Ip in 2011, the party aims at broadening the middle class and civil servant votes where the pro-Beijing camp had traditionally underperformed. Since Ip has strongly indicated her interest in becoming Chief Executive and has run in 2012 and 2017 respectively, it has been suggested that the party is primarily a vehicle for that goal.

The party won two seats in the 2012 Legislative Council election, with Ip re-elected in Hong Kong Island and vice chairman Michael Tien gained a seat in New Territories West. The NPP expanded its grassroots network by forming an alliance with regional political group Civil Force in 2014. With the groundwork of the Civil Force, the party gained an additional seat in New Territories East in 2016.

As the NPP became closer with the Beijing authorities, Tien split from the party with six other District Councillors in 2017. Being the vocal supporter of the SAR administration, the NPP received a devastating defeat in the 2019 District Council election amid the widespread anti-government protests in 2019, with all of its 28 candidates being defeated and all of its 13 District Councillors being unseated.

Party beliefs
The party positions itself with the pro-Beijing camp. Ip has said that it targets the "middle-class", rather than the "grass-roots". Its electorate base also largely comes from the civil service, especially retired officials from the disciplined services, due to Ip's background. The party's stated platform includes universal suffrage, economic diversification and the reduction in the wealth gap.

History

Early years
The leading figure of the New People's Party is Regina Ip, who was the then Secretary for Security and the incumbent member of the Legislative Council, as well as the chair of the think tank Savantas Policy Institute. She founded the New People's Party on 9 January 2011. Michael Tien, former vice chairman of the Liberal Party and younger brother of former Liberal Party chair James Tien, is the deputy chairman. Another deputy chairman was Louis Shih.

The party intended to field ten candidates in the district council elections in November 2011. Candidates would include three former senior security service officers in Tony Liu Kit-ming, the soon-to-retire chairman of the Hong Kong Police Inspectors Association; Wat Ki-on, the retired former chairman of the Fire Services Department Ambulancemen's Union; and Tsui Chi-keung, the retired former chairman of the Fire Services Department Staff's General Association. It won four seats in total as a result.

Ip announced her interest in running for the Chief Executive in the 2012 election, but failed to secure enough nominations to enter the race. She then endorsed Leung Chun-ying, winner of the election. In September, both chair Regina Ip and deputy chair Michael Tien were elected to the Legislative Council in the LegCo elections. Regina Ip was subsequently appointed by Leung Chun-ying to the Executive Council in October 2012.

Alliance with Civil Force
The party expanded the network in the New Territories East by forming a political alliance with the Civil Force in February 2014. Civil Force leader Pun Kwok-shan was appointed Vice-Chairman of the New People's Party. With 17 Civil Force District Councillors and 2 independents joined the New People's Party, the party's seat in the District Councils jumped from 12 to 31.

In the 2015 District Council election, the NPP and Civil Force won 25 seats, while its seats in Tai Hang and Tai Koo Shing East in Hong Kong Island where Ip's base was taken by pro-democrats. Civil Force's base in Sha Tin was also lost to the pro-democrats with five veterans defeated by new faces.

The NPP scored a victory in the 2016 Legislative Council election by taking three seats in the geographical constituencies and doubled their vote share from 3.76 to 7.73 per cent. Incumbents Regina Ip and Michael Tien both received large vote share in Hong Kong Island and the New Territories West respectively with new face Eunice Yung first elected in the New Territories East despite the allegation of her being backed by the Liaison Office.

2017 Chief Executive election and Michael Tien departure
In December 2016, the party endorsed Ip's second bid in the 2017 Chief Executive election. Due to the lobbying by the Liaison Office for former Chief Secretary Carrie Lam and pro-democrats' aim to send former Financial Secretary John Tsang and retired judge Woo Kwok-hing into the race, Ip was squeezed out from canvassing a minimum number of 150 nominations in the 1,194-member Election Committee to enter the race for the second time. After the election, Ip said that the party may reposition itself to become less pro-establishment.

Michael Tien, the party deputy chairman, complained the election had "lost its shape" due to the increasing interference of "an invisible hand", referring to the Liaison Office. Tien indicated his support for John Tsang, although Ip endorsed Carrie Lam on the last day before the election. Tien eventually quit the party on 10 April with six District Councillors, citing the party's overly close tie with Beijing was one of the reasons of his departure. The numbers of Legislative Council seats dropped to two and District Councils to 19 as a result.

The party nominated Southern District Councillor Judy Chan to represent in the 2018 Legislative Council Hong Kong Island by-election running against independent democrat Au Nok-hin for the seat left vacant by the oath-taking controversy which resulted in the disqualification of six legislators. The party combined forces with the Democratic Alliance for the Betterment and Progress of Hong Kong (DAB) and the Hong Kong Federation of Trade Unions (FTU) to form a united front against the pro-democrats. As a result, Chan was narrowly defeated in the election by only three per cent of margin by receiving more than 127,000 votes.

A staunch supporter of the government amid the massive protests against the extradition bill, the party saw a massive departure of its members, many of which were District Councillors. The number of District Councillors dropped from 25 in the 2015 elections to 13 only. In the 2019 District Council election, the party suffered a devastating defeat by losing all its 13 seats in the District Councils and failing to get any candidate elected in the landslide victory of the pro-democracy camp.

Current years 
In February 2021, after Xia Baolong called for only "patriots" to be part of the Hong Kong government, the NPP voiced full support and claimed that "[T]he Legislative Council and the District Council, occupied by people who oppose the country's sovereignty and endanger national security... distorted Hong Kong's political system."

Performance in elections

Chief Executive elections

Legislative Council elections

District Council elections

Representatives

Executive Council
 Regina Ip

Legislative Council

District Councils
The party holds no District council seats after 2019 District Council election heavily defeated.

See also
United Front Work Department
United Front (China)

References

External links
 Official website
 
 

Political parties established in 2011
Political parties in Hong Kong
2011 establishments in Hong Kong
Conservative parties in Hong Kong